A Mason jar, also known as a canning jar or fruit jar, is a glass jar used in home canning to preserve food. It was named after American tinsmith John Landis Mason, who patented it in 1858. The jar's mouth has a screw thread on its outer perimeter to accept a metal ring or "band". The band, when screwed down, presses a separate stamped steel disc-shaped lid against the jar's rim.

Mason lost his patent for the jars and numerous other companies started manufacturing similar jars. Over the years, the brand name Mason became the genericized trademark for that style of glass home canning jar, and the word "Mason" can be seen on many Ball and Kerr brand jars. The style of jar is occasionally referred to by common brand names such as Ball jar (in the eastern US) or Kerr jar (in the western US) even if the individual jar isn't that brand.

In early 20th century America, Mason jars became useful to those who lived in areas with short growing seasons. The jars became an essential part of farming culture, while being used at fairs to display jams and pickles for judging and awards. This was a reflection of the labour that went into making the jams. The jams, pickles, and sauces would be given and exchanged as gifts during the holidays as a canned preserved good was of much value. The peak use of Mason jars came during World War II, when the U.S. government rationed food encouraging the public to grow their own. As migration to cities occurred, along with rise of the refrigerators, more efficient transport of goods made fruit and vegetables available year round emphasizing less need for food preservation. Contemporary industrial preservation transitioned to the use of plastics like bakelite and nylon and billions of containers were produced instead.

In the early to mid 2010s a revival of the Mason Jar occurred from a mix of the rise of thrifting and adoption by hipsters. Used as a novelty by major corporations like 7-Eleven to advertise new drinks, for greenwashing being branded as zero waste consumer lifestyle, or as a trendy presentation for dessert. In a search for authenticity, commodification of Mason jars occurred leading to irony. As drinking out of canning gear highlighted overconsumption and lack of scarcity, the opposite of the designed intention of the jars. Its utility has been praised for use as a variety of household functional and decorative purposes; such as an oil lantern, soap dispenser, speaker or vase.

On August 15, 2017, the Registrar at National Day Calendar proclaimed National Mason Jar Day to be observed annually as a National Holiday on November 30th, beginning in 2017.

History

Before Mason

French chef Nicolas Appert invented the method of preserving food by enclosing it in sealed containers. Among the earliest glass jars used for home canning were wax sealers, named in reference to the sealing wax that was poured into a channel around the lip to secure a tin lid. This process, though complicated and error-prone, became popular in the late 1830s or early 1840s and was still used to seal fruit jars until about 1890. The wax sealing process was largely the only one available until other sealing methods were developed.

John Landis Mason

In 1858, a Vineland, New Jersey tinsmith named John Landis Mason (1832–1902) invented and patented a screw threaded glass jar or bottle that became known as the Mason jar (U.S. Patent No. 22,186.) From 1857, when it was first patented, to the present, Mason jars have had hundreds of variations in shape and cap design. After Mason's patent expired, many other manufacturers produced glass jars for home canning using the Mason-style jar. 

The initial form of closure for the glass canning jar was a zinc screw-on cap, the precursor to today's screw-on lids. It usually had a milk-glass liner, but some of the earliest lids may have had transparent glass liners. The cap screwed down onto a rubber ring on the shoulder of the jar, not the lip. Between 1860 and 1900, many other patents were issued for Mason jar improvements and closures. In 1903 Alexander Kerr introduced lids with a permanent rubber seal. His improved design in 1915 used the modern design. Jars are closed with two-piece metal lids that seal on the rim. The jar lid has a rubber or rubber-like sealing surface and is held in place by a separate metal band.

Mason sold the patents for the Mason jar, to the Sheet Metal Screw Company of Lewis R. Boyd in 1859. Boyd had patented a white "milk-glass" insert for the zinc screw lids to theoretically lessen the chances that food would be tainted by contact with the metal lid. In 1871, Mason partnered with Boyd in the Consolidated Fruit Jar Company which licensed Mason jar patents to numerous glass makers. Letters of patent issued to Mason on May 10, 1870, for improvements to his fruit-canning jar was determined to be invalid as a result of a patent infringement case brought before the Southern District of New York on June 11, 1874. The court acknowledged that Mason had invented the jar in 1859, but he did not apply for a patent for an improved version of the fruit jar until 1868. In the meantime, several others had patented designs and Mason had known these jars were being produced and sold. The court ruled that Mason's delay in protecting his patent indicated he had abandoned his invention in the intervening years between 1859 and 1868 and had forfeited his patent. The court's decision allowed other manufacturers to patent, produce, and sell glass jars for canning.

Design variations
Variations of the Mason jar include the "Improved Mason" which sealed on a shoulder above the thread instead of below and the Atlas Strong Shoulder which had a reinforced shoulder area as the original design was subject to cracks from the stress at the sealing point. A new type of Mason jar known as a "bead" jar was introduced circa 1910 - 1915. These continuous screw-thread jars were designed with a bead between the screw threads and the shoulder as a sealing surface. The Ball Corporation's "Perfect Mason" jar, one of the most common jars of this style, was introduced circa 1913 and produced until the mid-20th century. It had several variations, including a square-shaped jar.

Ball Corporation brands
The Ball Corporation, which once dominated the market as the largest domestic manufacturer of home-canning jars, spun off its home-canning business in 1993. In 1939 the company manufactured 54% of all the canning jars made in the US. Ball ceased production of canning jars when its subsidiary, Alltrista, became a separate company in 1993. Ball Corp. acquired certain Kerr assets, including factories, in 1992 and the Kerr brand of glass home canning jars was absorbed into Alltrista in 1996. Alltrista was renamed Jarden Corporation in 2002. Newell Brands acquired Jarden Corporation in 2016. As of 2022, Newell manufactures canning jars under the brand names Ball, Bernardin, Golden Harvest, and Kerr.

Contemporary jar design

A complete Mason jar is composed of a tempered glass jar, a flat self-sealing lid, and a metal band.

The jars are made with either a wide mouth (3 inches) or regular mouth (2⅜ inches) opening. They come in a variety of sizes, from 4 ounces to a gallon. The half-gallon size and larger are not recommended for canning purposes. The most typical sizes used in canning are quart, pint, and half-pint. The jars typically have their brand name embossed on the side, though jars may also have a decorative design such as a quilting pattern or may be completely blank and smooth. Jars may be washed and reused so long as they have no chips or cracks.

In the illustration, the left half are wide mouth and the right half are regular mouth. From left to right: wide mouth half-pint, pint, 1½ pint, quart, then regular mouth quart, pint, half-pint, quarter-pint. The lids and bands are also shown. The two rightmost jars are quilted.

The lids are made of metal with a ring of sealing compound which acts as a gasket against the jar's rim. New sealing compound is only good for about five years from date of manufacture, so older unused lids should be discarded. Lids may not be used more than once. New lids are slightly domed (convex). During processing, air is vented from the jar and the food shrinks. While cooling, a vacuum is created inside the jar, sucking the dome downward (concave) — an indication that a seal is good. Processed jars should be stored in a manner where the lids are not disturbed and the seals remain intact.

The metal screw bands are used to properly align the lids onto the jar, and to hold the lid in place during processing. They should be removed after processing and may be reused many times as long as they are kept rust-free and undented.

Collecting vintage jars

The value of a jar is related to its age, rarity, color, and condition. A jar's age and rarity can be determined by the color, shape, mold and production marks of the glass, and the jar's closure. Mason jars usually have a proprietary brand embossed on the jar. Early jars embossed with "Mason's Patent November 28th 1858" that date from the late 1850s to early 1860s closely match the illustrations of Mason's 1858 patents. Mouth-blown (or hand-blown) jars embossed with a version of "Mason's Patent November 28th 1858" were made about 1857 to 1908 and often had a ground lip as well. By 1908 semi-automatic machines manufactured the majority of these jars. Machine-made Mason jars that originated around 1909 have a sealing surface on a bead ledge below the threads. This type of jar dominated the market by the mid to late 1910s. Manufacturers continued to make jars with the beaded seal after the mid-twentieth century. Ball's "Ideal" canning jar, which first appeared around 1915 and was discontinued in 1962, is one of the company's best-known jars and is popular among collectors.

Most antique jars that are not colorless are aqua or "Ball blue," a blue-green shade that was named for the Ball Corporation, a prevalent jar manufacturer. Most mouth-blown Mason jars embossed with some type of 1858 patent date were produced in aqua glass. The Ball brand of Mason jars were manufactured in several colors, but the most common color was the distinctive "Ball blue," which the Ball Corporation used in its jars from about 1910 to 1930. Mason jars with this particular color of glass may be attributed to Ball, since "virtually no other bottle or jar was made in that color." 

Older styles of home canning jars are "Not Recommended" by the U.S.-based National Center for Home Food Preservation, the United States Department of Agriculture, and University Extension Services. These include: those using a zinc cap and a rubber jar ring, and those using a glass lid, wire bail, and rubber sealing ring. These provide "no definitive way to determine if a vacuum seal is formed".

See also 

 Home canning
Other canning jar types/brands:
 Fowler's Vacola jar – Australian product, glass jar sealed with a rubber ring, metal lid, and a spring fastener
 Kilner jar — British canning jar brand; rubber-sealed, screw-topped jar
 Weck jar – German product, glass jar with glass lid, rubber seal, metal spring clips

References

General references

External links 

 Historic canning jars
 A Primer on Fruit Jars
 The Knox Glass Bottle Co. Mason Jars, research and illustrations
 Ball Perfect Mason fruit jars
 Mason's Patent Nov. 30th 1858 fruit jars

Glass jars
History of glass
Canned food
Food storage containers
1858 introductions